Permission to Land is the debut studio album by the British glam rock band The Darkness, released on 7 July 2003 in the UK and 16 September 2003 in the US. The album topped the UK Albums Chart and reached number thirty-six on the American Billboard 200 chart. Five singles were released from Permission to Land: "Get Your Hands off My Woman", "Growing on Me", "I Believe in a Thing Called Love", "Christmas Time (Don't Let the Bells End)" (which only appears on the German Christmas edition), and "Love Is Only a Feeling". "I Believe in a Thing Called Love" was the most successful, reaching number two on the UK Singles Chart.

History
The band was renowned for their live shows from very early on, and such was the popularity of the band, they had a Carling Homecoming gig booked for the London Astoria before they had even signed a record deal. Joe Taylor, Aled Jones and Paul Scaife at The Tip Sheet, a weekly magazine and CD insert for UK music industry insiders, first heard about the band through a post on The Tip Sheet message board, and featured "Love is Only a Feeling" in January 2002. Record of the Day featured the song again around the time of SXSW in March 2003. "Friday Night" was to be featured next, but they were told the band was saving it for an album.

According to A&R man Nick Raphael in an interview with HitQuarters, there was no initial clamour to sign the band, "There couldn’t have been less of a buzz, and only two record labels showed any interest in them." He believes the reason for lack of interest was that "The business as a whole thought they were uncool. In fact, people were saying that they were a joke and that they weren’t real." As part of Sony Music UK, Raphael had attempted to sign them but the band instead opted to go with Atlantic Records.

Permission to Land went straight up to number two on the UK Albums Chart upon its release on 7 July 2003, before going to number one and staying there for four weeks, eventually going on to sell over 1.4 million copies in the UK alone.

Recording
The band took inspiration for some of their work from the local north Suffolk area surrounding their home town, Lowestoft, including "Black Shuck", based on the legend of a dog which supposedly haunts the church of the nearby village of Blythburgh. "Stuck in a Rut" also mentions a set of roads known as the "Barnby Bends", and the "Acle Straight", both of which are prominent routes between Lowestoft and Beccles and Norwich and Great Yarmouth respectively. The band recorded an interview for MTV Japan, which discusses the inspiration behind these songs, as well as featuring self-filmed footage of their home town. This features on a bonus DVD included with the Japanese deluxe edition of the album.

Both brothers, Justin and Dan Hawkins used Gibson Les Paul Standard guitars for recording of the album with Justin plugged into an old, early version of the Mesa Boogie Rectifier and Dan into a Marshall plexi. Reports also that a THD Univalve was used in the recording.

Critical reception

The album received widespread acclaim by critics. At Metacritic, which assigns a normalised rating out of 100 to reviews from mainstream critics, the album earned an average score of 79, based on 19 reviews.

"Permission to Land will never be the album that The Darkness think it is," decided Classic Rock, "but, taken in the spirit that it is offered, it's certainly more fun than Use Your Illusion." In July 2019, Decibel Magazine inducted Permission to Land into their Hall of Fame, stating that the album "that came to define hard rock in the early aughts sounds nothing like anything else that was released in 2003 – or the previous decade, for that matter".

Awards and accolades

The success of this album led to heavy touring for the band, including European portions of Metallica's Summer Sanitarium Tour 2003. They then went on to headline the Carling Festival in 2004. The band won three BRIT Awards in 2004 in response to the album, Best Group, Best Rock Group and Best Album. They also won two Kerrang! awards in 2004 for Best Live Act and Best British Band. The third single from the album, "I Believe in a Thing Called Love", was a substantial hit in the UK as was their tilt at the Christmas 2003 number 1, "Christmas Time (Don't Let the Bells End)", which only just fell short, both singles reaching No.2 in 2003.

In addition to its chart success, Permission to Land also provided the Darkness with two high-profile music awards; Best Rock Album at the 2003 Kerrang! Awards and Best British Album at the 2004 BRIT Awards (at which they also won the awards for Best British Group and Best British Rock Act). Permission to Land was voted 49th in the 50 Greatest Albums of the 21st Century in Kerrang!. Permission to Land was later referenced in the song "Whichever Way You Wanna Give It" by lead singer Justin Hawkins' other band Hot Leg.
In 2005, the album was ranked number 356 in Rock Hard magazine's book The 500 Greatest Rock & Metal Albums of All Time. The album was also included in the book 1001 Albums You Must Hear Before You Die. In 2016, Metal Hammer ranked Permission to Land sixty-third in their list of the 100 Greatest Albums of the 21st Century, calling it 'one of the greatest debut albums of all time'.

Track listing

Personnel

Justin Hawkins – vocals, lead and rhythm guitar, synthesizer, piano
Dan Hawkins – rhythm and lead guitar
Frankie Poullain – bass guitar
Ed Graham – drums

Additional

Pedro Ferreira – production, mixing, engineering
Mike Marsh – mastering
Will Bartle – recording assistance
Nick Taylor – mixing assistance
Bruce Band – artwork
Patrick Ford – photography

Charts

Weekly charts

Year-end charts

Certifications

References

External links

2003 debut albums
The Darkness (band) albums
Atlantic Records albums
Brit Award for British Album of the Year
European Border Breakers Award-winning albums